The State Colleges and Universities Athletic Association (SCUAA) is an association of 93 institutions, conferences, organizations, and individuals that organizes the athletic programs of different state colleges and universities in the Philippines. SCUAA is one of the inter-collegiate sports associations in the Philippines, the union of seven major state colleges and universities in Metro Manila.

History

The organization was established as State Colleges Athletic Association (SCAA) in 1953 encompassing the Philippine Normal College, Central Luzon Agricultural College, the Philippine College of Commerce, and the Philippine College of Arts and Trade.

Despite many years of challenges in the forefront, SCUAA was able to gain ground in various regions in the country through the creation of regional or satellite SCUAA, hence the establishment of a National SCUAA in the mid-1980s. Two years after, the first National SCUAA Olympics was held with member state colleges and universities from Regions I, IV, V, VIII, and NCR participating.

Conferences

National Capital Region

The 23rd Season of SCUAA-NCR was held in PUP. The opening ceremony of this season is one of the most colorful and unforgettable ceremony in the league history. The 24th season was hosted by TUP, 25th Season was staged by PNU. The PNU Torchbearer Pep Squad lead the performance for a very spectacular and amazing opening number, making the silver anniversary of SCUUA a day to remember. The PhilSCA is expected to host the 26th Season of SCUAA-NCR in 2014.

Ilocos Region

The SCUAA-I Conference is composed of the six State Universities and Colleges in the Ilocos Region.  It also included the SUCs in what is now the Cordillera Administrative Region (when it was still part of Region I).

The latest season of the SCUAA-I Conference was held at the Pangasinan State University.

Cagayan Valley

The SCUAA II is one of the divisions of SCUAA which serves the region of Cagayan Valley. The host for the 2008 season was the Nueva Vizcaya State University. Emerging as the champion for the 2008 season was the CSU Maroons, followed by NVSU, ISU, then QSC.

SUC Olympic III – Central Luzon

host 2006 RMTU of Zambales Over-all Champion BulSU Gold Gears
host 2007 CLSU of Muñoz City Over-all Champion BulSU Gold Gears
host 2008 PAC of Pampanga Over-all Champion BulSU Gold Gears
host 2009 TCA of Tarlac Over-all Champion BulSU Gold Gears
host 2010 BulSU of Bulacan Over-all Champion BulSU Gold Gears
host 2011 TSU of Tarlac Over-all Champion BulSU Gold Gears
host 2012 RMTU of Zambales Over-all Champion BulSU Gold Gears
host 2012 BPSU of Bataan Over-all Champion BulSU Gold Gears
host 2013 NEUST of Nueva Ecija Over-all Champion BulSU Gold Gears
host 2014 TCA of Tarlac Over-all Champion BulSU Gold Gears
host 2015 PSAU of Pampanga Over-all Champion BulSU Gold Gears
host 2016 PSAU of Pampanga Over-all Champion BulSU Gold Gears
host 2017 BulSu of Bulacan Over-all Champion BulSU Gold Gears
host 2018 TSU of Tarlac Over-all Champion BulSU Gold Gears
host 2019 TSU of Tarlac Over-all Champion BulSU Gold Gears
host 2022 TAU of Tarlac Over-all Champion BulSU Gold Gears

BulSU Gold Gears is an overall champion for more than 17 consecutive years.

STRASUC formerly SCUAA IV A & B

host 2003 RSC of Odiongan, Romblon; Over-all Champion CvSU Hornets
host 2004 LSPC of Santa Cruz, Laguna
host 2005 LSPC of Santa Cruz, Laguna
host 2006 PSU of Puerto Princesa City, Palawan
host 2007 MSC of Boac, Marinduque; Over-all Champion CvSU Hornets
host 2008 RSC of Odiongan, Romblon;
host 2009 SLSU of Lucban, Quezon Province; Over-all Champion CvSU Hornets
host 2010 CvSU of Indang, Cavite; Over-all Champion CvSU Hornets
host 2011 RSU of Odiongan, Romblon; Over-all Champion CvSU Hornets
host 2012 CvSU of Indang, Cavite; Over-all Champion PSU Bearcats
host 2013 MinSCAT of Victoria, Oriental Mindoro; Over-all Champion PSU Bearcats
host 2013–2014 BatStateU of Batangas City; Over-all Champion BatStateU Red Blades
host 2014–2015 UP Los Baños, Laguna; Over-all Champion PSU Bearcats
host 2015–2016 WPU of Aborlan, Palawan; Over-all Champion PSU Bearcats
host 2016–2017 URS of Morong, Rizal

SCUAA V – Bicol Region

host 2008 CSC of Virac, Catanduanes Over-all Champion  BU
host 2009 CSPC of Nabua, Camarines Sur Over-all Champion  BU, 1st CNSC, 2nd CSPC

SCUAA VI – Western Visayas Region

host 2009 WVSU of Iloilo Over-all Champion WVSU Eagles

SCUAA VII – Central Visayas Region

SCUAA VIII – Eastern Visayas Region

1After its withdrawal from the games years ago, UPVTC will once again compete in the next season of SCUAA. 
2The forestmen bowed out from the games after it was merged with TTMIST to create NwSSU.  
host 2006 season 22nd NIT of Naval, Biliran Over-all Champion
host 2007 season 23rd TTMIST of Calbayog, Samar Over-all champion
host 2008 season 24th SLSU of Sogod, Southern Leyte Over-all Champion PIT Mariners, 1st EVSU Hawks, 2nd ESSU Falcons
host 2009 season 25th VSU of Baybay, Leyte  Over-all Champion PIT Mariners, 1st EVSU Hawks, 2nd UEP Dolphins
host 2011 season 27th UEP of Catarman, Northern Samar Over-all Champion UEP Dolphins, 2nd EVSU Hawks

Mindanao Association State Colleges and Universities Foundation (MASCUF)

Zamboanga Peninsula

Northern Mindanao

Davao Region

host 2017 Regional SCUAA – DOSCST – Mati, Davao Oriental 
   - Champion - DOSCST
   - 1st Runner-Up - USeP-A
   - 2nd Runner-Up - UP-Mindanao

Soccsksargen

Caraga Region

Bangsamoro Autonomous Region in Muslim Mindanao

2009 host BukSU of Bukidnon Over-all Champion

See also

 Philippine Association of State Universities and Colleges
 Mindanao Association State Colleges and Universities Foundation

References

Student sport in the Philippines